The 2022–23 CEV Cup is the 51st edition of the second most important European volleyball club competition organised by the European Volleyball Confederation.

This year’s edition of the CEV Cup consists of 43 teams, of which 30 teams qualify directly for the CEV Cup; 9 teams are the losers from the Champions League qualifciation phase; and the remaining 4 join the rest in the quarterfinals, being transferred there from the Champions League group stage as the 3rd placed teams in their respective pools.

Participating teams
Drawing of Lots was held on 28 June 2022 in Luxembourg City.

Format
Qualification round (Home and away matches):
32nd Finals

Main phase (Home and away matches):
16th Finals → 8th Finals → Playoffs → 4th Finals

Final phase (Home and away matches):
Semifinals → Finals

Aggregate score is counted as follows: 3 points for 3–0 or 3–1 win, 2 points for 3–2 win, 1 point for 2–3 loss.
In case the teams are tied after two legs, a Golden Set is played immediately at the completion of the second leg.

Qualification round

32nd Finals

|}

First leg
|}

Second leg
|}

Main phase

16th Finals

|}

First leg
|}

Second leg
|}

8th Finals

|}

First leg
|}

Second leg
|}

Playoffs

|}

First leg
|}

Second leg
|}

4th Finals

|}

First leg
|}

Second leg
|}

Final phase

Semifinals

|}

First leg
|}

Second leg
|}

Finals

|}

First leg
|}

Second leg
|}

Final standings

References

External links
 Official website

CEV Cup
CEV Cup
CEV Cup
CEV